"Stenoplastis" flavibasis is a moth of the family Notodontidae. It is found in Peru.

Taxonomy
The species probably does not belong in Stenoplastis, but has not been placed in another genus yet.

References

Moths described in 1925
Notodontidae of South America